Bubley is a surname. Notable people with the surname include:

Ernest Bubley (1913–1996), English table tennis player
Esther Bubley (1921–1998), American photojournalist and documentary photographer
Erin Heatherton (born Bubley in 1989), American fashion model and actress

See also
Burley (surname)